Jamie Rose (born November 26, 1959) is an American actress and acting instructor. Born in New York City, Rose was raised in Southern California, where she began her career as a child actor, first appearing in commercials. She made her feature film debut in the cult horror film Just Before Dawn (1981), and subsequently had supporting roles in Clint Eastwood's Tightrope and Heartbreakers (both 1984).

Rose has numerous television credits, including the role of Vickie Gioberti on the primetime soap opera Falcon Crest (1981–1983), as well as the lead on the crime series Lady Blue (1985–1986). Later film credits include Atlas Shrugged: Part II (2012), as well as guest-starring roles on the series Jane the Virgin (2015) and Grey's Anatomy (2016).

Since 2007, Rose has operated her own acting studio workshop, JRose Studio, in Los Angeles. She has also written a book, Shut Up and Dance! The Joy of Letting Go of the Lead--On the Dance Floor and Off, published in 2011.

Early life
Rose was born November 26, 1959 in New York City to Stewart, a singer and dancer, and Reta Rose, a former Radio City Rockette. Shortly after her birth, Rose's family relocated from New York City to California, where she was raised in the Van Nuys section of Los Angeles. Her father was Jewish, and she was raised in this faith. Rose began acting at age six, first appearing in commercials for Kool-Aid, and later, Mountain Dew as an adolescent. When Rose was fourteen, the family relocated to Fresno, where her father accepted a job as a building contractor. Rose graduated from Bullard High School in Fresno, and subsequently attended Fresno State University before transferring to the University of California, Santa Cruz. After a year, Rose decided to return to Los Angeles, and transferred to California State University, Northridge, where she majored in theater; she eventually dropped out, however, to begin acting professionally.

Career
She made her feature film debut in Jeff Lieberman's slasher film Just Before Dawn (1981), and subsequently had supporting roles in Clint Eastwood's Tightrope and Heartbreakers (both 1984).

Rose portrayed Vickie Gioberti on the primetime soap opera Falcon Crest (1981–1983), as well as the lead on the crime series Lady Blue (1985–1986). She would go on to have guest-starring roles on various series in the 1980s, including Hotel, Columbo, and Murder, She Wrote. She also had a supporting part in the 1996 television film Lying Eyes, as well as guest appearances on Chicago Hope (1994–1995), Renegade (1994–1996), Ally McBeal (1997), and Walker, Texas Ranger (also 1997).

In 2012, Rose guest-starred on the series Criminal Minds and had a supporting role in the film Atlas Shrugged: Part II. She subsequently had guest-starring roles on Jane the Virgin (2015) and Grey's Anatomy (2016).

Book
Jamie Rose's memoir/self-help book about her experiences learning the tango and how it affected her relationship, Shut Up and Dance! The Joy of Letting Go of the Lead--On the Dance Floor and Off, was released September 15, 2011.

Personal life
Rose married filmmaker James Orr in 1986, though they later divorced. In 2006, Rose married actor Kip Gilman, whom she met on a blind date in 1997. They divorced in 2017.  Since September 2007, she has been teaching acting through her JRose Studio in Los Angeles, California.

Filmography

Film

Television

References

Sources

External links

 JRose Studio
 

1959 births
Living people
Acting teachers
Actresses from Fresno, California
Actresses from Los Angeles
Actresses from New York City
American child actresses
American film actresses
American television actresses
California State University, Northridge alumni
Jewish American actresses
20th-century American actresses
21st-century American actresses